This is a list of the Finland national football team results from 2000 to 2019.

Head-to-head record

Results

2000

2001

2002

2003

2004

2005

2006

2007

2008

2009

2010

2011

2012

2013

2014

2015

2016

2017

2018

2019

See also
 Finland national football team results (1911–1930)
 Finland national football team results (1930–1969)
 Finland national football team results (1970–1979)
 Finland national football team results (1980–1989)
 Finland national football team results (1990–1999)
 Finland national football team results (2000–2019)
 Finland national football team results (2020–present)
 Finland national football team head to head
 Finland women's national football team results

References

External links

Results
National football team results